Eric Barton (born September 29, 1977) is a former American football linebacker who played for twelve seasons in the National Football League (NFL). He played college football at Maryland before he was drafted by the Oakland Raiders in the fifth round of the 1999 NFL Draft. He played for the Raiders from 1999 to 2003, the New York Jets from 2004 to 2008, and the Cleveland Browns from 2009 to 2010.

Early years
Barton went to Thomas A. Edison High School (Fairfax County, Virginia) in Alexandria, Virginia.

College career
Barton attended the University of Maryland where he majored in criminology and criminal justice. Barton Earned All-American honors from the National Recruiting Advisor and an All-Atlantic Coast recognition from Blue Chip Illustrated Magazine and was rated 10th-best football player in Virginia by Super Prep Magazine as a senior at Edison High School in Alexandria, Virginia. He recorded more than 100 tackles as a sophomore, junior and senior at Maryland, which helped land him fourth on the career tackles list. He also led the ACC in solo tackles as junior and senior. He was an All-ACC first-team selection as senior and led conference in total tackles (159) and average tackles per game (14.5).

Professional career

Oakland Raiders
Barton was selected by the Oakland Raiders in the fifth round (146th overall) of the 1999 NFL Draft.

He saw action in all of his 16 games in the 1999 NFL season, making three starts and finishing with 29 tackles and two sacks. He recorded a sack in the first play of his first NFL start and finished with, a team-high, eight tackles in Week 15 vs. Tampa Bay Buccaneers. He started and tallied 13 tackles at LB in Super Bowl XXXVII in a loss to the Buccaneers. He led the team for the ninth time on the season with a nine-tackle performance vs. the Kansas City Chiefs in the season finale.

New York Jets
Barton signed with the New York Jets as an unrestricted free agent in 2004. He registered nine or more tackles seven times in the 2004 NFL season, including an AFC Wild Card victory over the San Diego Chargers. He earned AFC Defensive Player of the Week honors as a result of nine tackles, one sack, one INT, two PD, one FF and one FR in a Week 15 win vs. the Seattle Seahawks. Barton led the defense with a career-high 16 tackles, including 12 solo and one for loss, in a defeat against the Buffalo Bills. He was placed on the Injured Reserve, for the first time in his career after suffering an ankle injury. He also became the first Jet defender since 2000 to record a sack and interception on the same drive against the Washington Redskins. To that point, he played in 120 career regular season games with 85 starts. He had recorded 680 tackles, 18.5 sacks, four INTs, 18 passes deflected, six forced fumbles, and four fumble recoveries in his career. Barton had also posted four seasons with 100 or more total tackles.

Cleveland Browns
Barton signed with the Cleveland Browns as an unrestricted free agent on March 13, 2009 and played 2 years with them. Up to the 2010 NFL season, after 12 years of play, he is the only player still active in the NFL among those drafted in the fifth round of the 1999 NFL Draft. On February 9, 2011, Barton was released by the Browns.

Personal life
Barton was adopted and met his brother, Aaron Curry, a former NFL linebacker, and his birth mother, Chris Curry, for the first time on October 30, 2010.

References

External links

Cleveland Browns bio
New York Jets bio

1977 births
Living people
African-American players of American football
Sportspeople from Alexandria, Virginia
American football linebackers
Maryland Terrapins football players
Oakland Raiders players
New York Jets players
Cleveland Browns players
Thomas A. Edison High School (Fairfax County, Virginia) alumni
21st-century African-American sportspeople
20th-century African-American sportspeople
Ed Block Courage Award recipients